The  was an infantry division of the Imperial Japanese Army. It was formed 10 November 1944 in Heilongjiang as a triangular division. The nucleus for the formation was the leftovers of 23rd division and the 8th borders guards garrison. The division was initially assigned to the 6th army.

Action
Initially the 119th division was garrisoning a Hailar, but 25 January 1945 was reassigned to 4th army without changing a location.

During Soviet invasion of Manchuria the 119th division has surrendered 16 August 1945 and was disarmed by 3 September 1945. The last soldiers taking prisoner by Red Army were returned to Japan in 1968.

See also
 List of Japanese Infantry Divisions

Notes and references
This article incorporates material from Japanese Wikipedia page 第119師団 (日本軍), accessed 28 June 2016
 Madej, W. Victor, Japanese Armed Forces Order of Battle, 1937–1945 [2 vols], Allentown, PA: 1981.

Japanese World War II divisions
Infantry divisions of Japan
Military units and formations established in 1944
Military units and formations disestablished in 1945
1944 establishments in Japan
1945 disestablishments in Japan